Eskemukerjea is a genus of flowering plants belonging to the family Polygonaceae. The only species is Eskemukerjea megacarpum.

Its native range is Nepal.

References

Polygonaceae
Monotypic Polygonaceae genera